CEE Bankwatch Network is a global network which operates in central and eastern Europe. There are 17 member groups, multiple non-governmental organizations based in different locations; the network is one of the largest networks of environmental NGOs in central and eastern Europe. Bankwatch's headquarters rest in Prague, Czech Republic.

Bankwatch was set up in 1995, and it focuses on monitoring the actions of different international financial institutions, such as the European Investment Bank (EIB) and European Bank for Reconstruction and Development (EBRD), while publicizing and exposing potential risks of the projects to the public in order to address environmental, social, and economical causes. The network aims to influence the decisions of the EIB and the EBRD and campaign for the protection of human rights and the environment.

Main Areas of Work
 Coal mining and power plants 
 Unsustainable hydro power plants 
 Extractive industries

Projects followed by CEE Bankwatch Network

Fossil Fuel Projects
 Rovinari Power Station, Romania 
 Gacko II, Bosnia and Herzegovina
 Southern Gas Corridor
 Ugljevik Power Plant, Bosnia and Herzegovina
 Pljevlja lignite power plant, Montenegro
 Tuzla lignite power plant, Bosnia and Herzegovina
 Sostanj lignite thermal power plant, Slovenia 
 Stanari lignite power plant, Bosnia and Herzegovina
 Kolubara B lignite-fired power plant, Serbia and Kolubara lignite mine, Serbia
 Kostolac B3 lignite power plant, Serbia
 Kosova e Re lignite power plant, Kosovo
 Plomin coal power plant, Croatia
 Sakhalin-II oil and gas project, Russia

Unsustainable Renewable Projects
 Boskov most hydropower plant, North Macedonia 
 Krapska Reka hydropower plant, Macedonia
 Dabrova Dolina hydropower plant, Croatia
 Buk Bijela dam and the Upper Drina cascade, Bosnia and Herzegovina  
 Shuakhevi hydropower plant, Georgia
 Nenskra hydropower plant, Georgia 
 Olkaria geothermal development, Kenya

Transport Projects
 Kresna gorge / Struma motorway, Bulgaria
 Khudoni hydropower plant, Georgia
 Volkswagen's emissions scandal and the EU's bank
 Mombasa-Mariakani road project, Kenya
 Corridor Vc motorway, Bosnia and Herzegovina

Municipal Infrastructure
 Belgrade incinerator, Serbia

Agrobussiness
 Myronivsky Hliboproduct (MHP), Ukraine

Extractive Industries
 Kumtor Gold Mine, Kyrgyzstan

Member Group Organizations

 Bulgaria, Centre for Environmental Information and Education
 Bulgaria, Za Zemiata
 Croatia, Zelena Akcia
 Czech Republic, Hnutí Duha
 Czech Republic, Centre For Transport And Energy
 Estonia, Estonian Green Movement
 Georgia, Green Alternative
 Hungary, National Society of Conservationists - Friends of the Earth Hungary
 Latvia, Green Liberty
 Lithuania, Atgaja
 Macedonia, Eko-svest
 Poland, Polish Green Network (Polska Zielona Siec)
 Russia, Sakhalin Environmental Watch
 Serbia, Center for Ecology and Sustainable Development
 Slovakia, Friends of the Earth - CEPA
 Ukraine, Ecoaction (Екодія)
 Ukraine, National Ecological Centre of Ukraine

References

Environmental organizations based in the Czech Republic
Organizations based in Prague